Intelligent Nation 2015 (iN2015) is a 10-year masterplan by the Government of Singapore to improve Singapore's infocomm infrastructure over the next decade. Led by the Infocomm Development Authority of Singapore (IDA), iN2015 involves several organisations.

According to IDA, iN2015 is the blueprint to navigate Singapore's 'transition into a global city, universally recognised as an enviable synthesis of technology, infrastructure, enterprise and manpower'.

The Singapore government hopes to use iN2015 to greatly expand Singapore's infocomm industry.

Purpose 
The vision of iN2015 is: Singapore: An Intelligent Nation, A Global City, Powered By Infocomm.

The goals of the programme are as follows:
 To be the first in the world in harnessing infocomm to add value to the economy and society.
 To realise a 2–fold increase in the value-add of the infocomm industry to S$26 billion.
 To realise a 3–fold increase in infocomm export revenue to S$60 billion.
 To create 80,000 additional jobs.
 To achieve 90% home broadband usage.
 To achieve 100% computer ownership in homes with school-going children.

An integrated government 
Citizens can expect more proactive, user-friendly, responsive and integrated Government services even on the move. They can provide feedback and exchange views with the Government on public policies and initiatives from anywhere, at any time. This will further enhance the Government's capacity from the synergy that comes with shared services and common application platforms.

Using infocomm as a catalyst, public agencies will work with the private sector to spearhead innovative infocomm projects that give businesses in Singapore a competitive edge. Citizens will benefit from convenient access to integrated, user-friendly e-services and information online, becoming active stakeholders in public policy formulation.

Learning 
Infocomm will empower individuals to learn at one's own pace, place, and time. Learning will take place in environments that provide the best context, be It at the zoo, museums, or outside the classroom.

Beyond textbooks, students, and teachers will have access to a wealth of interactive digital learning resources. Outside the school, teachers can monitor the progress of learners through new assessment modes and form virtual communities to learn from and collaborate with others within and outside Singapore. Education will engage students, enrich lives and meet the diverse needs of each individual.

Healthcare 
Infocomm will link hospitals, clinics, nursing homes and laboratories with patients' homes, enabling healthcare professionals to access comprehensive patient information
instantly.

It will develop the infrastructure that will transform biomedical research into healthcare delivery and empower individuals, giving them more control of their health through access to
personal healthcare records and relevant healthcare information.

An integrated healthcare delivery system will give individuals the ability to better manage their health and access high quality clinical care. It will provide cost-effective healthcare, excellence in service and support strong clinical research.

Economic components 
Infocomm will make Singapore a premier wealth management centre, with intelligent data management and analysis and efficient back- office processes and the assurance of authentication, privacy, information systems and security.

A corporate financial information exchange will provide automated reporting, corporate transparency and greater analytical coverage. Next-generation infrastructure will enable nationwide electronic and mobile payments, offering new transactional and value-added services and new e-payment solutions.

Global financial institutions will find Singapore both a centre of innovative financial services and the ideal location to service regional customers, manage high-end financial processes, and develop and market innovative financial products and services.

Infocomm will augment high value-added activities such as research and product development. It will help develop new manufacturing services business models, reduce time to markets and support one platform for national trade information and transactions.

It will provide a world-class logistics infrastructure and enable global, strategic supply chain activities as well as innovative supply chain management. Companies will build and manage adaptive supply chains out of Singapore and facilitate complex manufacturing capabilities made possible by the infocomm infrastructure. A national integrated platform will augment trade information exchange.

Strategies 
The government plans to spearhead the transformation of key economic sectors, government and society through more sophisticated and innovative use of infocomm by iN2015. It is also establishing an ultra-high speed, pervasive, intelligent and trusted infocomm infrastructure through the Wireless@SG programme where Singaporeans can access the net in various cells throughout the island, the cells now numbering to 5000. The overall plan of iN2015 is to develop a globally competitive infocomm industry and due to Singapore's dependence on its only resource, its people, the iN2015 masterplan is to develop an infocomm-savvy workforce and globally competitive infocomm manpower.

Opportunities 
The IDA hopes that the iN2015 will help create many opportunities in the infocomm industry of Singapore. In the iN2015 website, it is hoped that it will be 'transforming lives & businesses', 'fuelling competitive enterprise', 'providing the infrastructure' and 'developing human capital'.

Infrastructure 
The masterplan's next-generation wireless and wired infrastructure will be delivering more innovative and trusted services. Starting with Wireless@SG, the infrastructure will hopefully grow to be ultra-high speed, pervasive and intelligent.

Labour force 
iN2015 aims to attract and develop an innovative, infocomm-savvy workforce and global infocomm talent for Singapore, to enhance economic competitiveness and the economic growth of Singapore.

References

External links 
 iN2015 – official website

Internet in Singapore